USS SC-23, until July 1920 known as USS Submarine Chaser No. 23 or USS S.C. 23, was an SC-1-class submarine chaser built for the United States Navy during World War I.

SC-23 was a wooden-hulled 110-foot (34 m) submarine chaser built at the New York Navy Yard at Brooklyn, New York. She was commissioned on 16 October 1917 as USS Submarine Chaser No. 23, abbreviated at the time as USS S.C. 23.

During World War I, S.C. 23 served in the  Group of submarine chasers.

When the U.S. Navy adopted its modern hull number system on 17 July 1920, Submarine Chaser No. 23 was classified as SC-23 and her name was shortened to USS SC-23.

Sometime in 1920, SC-23 was destroyed by fire.

References 
 
 NavSource Online: Submarine Chaser Photo Archive: SC-23
 The Subchaser Archives: The History of U.S. Submarine Chasers in the Great War Hull number: SC-23
 Woofenden, Todd A. Hunters of the Steel Sharks: The Submarine Chasers of World War I. Bowdoinham, Maine: Signal Light Books, 2006. .

SC-1-class submarine chasers
World War I patrol vessels of the United States
Ships built in Brooklyn
1917 ships